Alsop, Allsop or Allsopp may refer to:

People

In arts and media
Anthony Alsop (died 1726), English poetical writer
Frederick W. Allsop (1867–1946), American author and philanthropist
George Alsop (born c.1638), English-American writer, historian and settler
Jack Allsopp (born 1975), English musician, stage name Just Jack
Jane Allsop (born 1975), Australian actress
Joseph Alsop (1910–1989), American journalist
Kenneth Allsop (1920–1973), British broadcaster, author and naturalist
Kirstie Allsopp (born 1971), British TV presenter
Marin Alsop (born 1956), American conductor
Peter Alsop (born 1946), American musician and children's entertainer
Peter F. B. Alsop (died 2014), Australian engineer and historian
Richard Alsop (1761–1815), American author
Sofie Allsopp (born 1980), British television presenter
Stewart Alsop (1914–1974), American newspaper columnist and political analyst
Stewart Alsop, Jr. (born 1952), American journalist and businessman
Susan Mary Alsop (1918–2004), American socialite and writer
Thomas Allsop (1795–1880), English stockbroker and author
Will Alsop (born 1947), British architect

In politics

United Kingdom
George Higginson Allsopp (1846–1907), English brewer and politician
Henry Allsopp, 1st Baron Hindlip (1811–1887), British businessman and Member of Parliament
Samuel Allsopp, 2nd Baron Hindlip (1842–1897), British businessman and Member of Parliament

United States
Donald Alsop (born 1927), American federal judge
John Alsop (1724–1794), American delegate to the Continental Congress
John T. Alsop (1887–1957), American politician, mayor of Jacksonville, Florida, 1923-1937
Joseph Wright Alsop IV (1876–1953), American politician and insurance executive

Elsewhere
George Waters Allsopp (1769–1837), Canadian seigneur, businessman and political figure
James Allsop, Chief Justice of the Federal Court of Australia
Robert Alsop (1814–1871), Canadian merchant and political figure

In sport

Cricket
Frederic Allsopp (1857–1928), English cricketer
George Allsop (1864–1927), South African cricketer
Herbert Allsopp (1855–1920), English cricketer and soldier
Thomas Allsopp (1880–1919), English cricketer and footballer
Tom Alsop (born 1995), English cricketer

Football
Danny Allsopp (born 1978), Australian football (soccer) player
Gilbert Alsop (1908–1992), English footballer
Julian Alsop (born 1973), English footballer
Ryan Allsop (born 1992), English professional footballer
Thomas Allsopp (1880–1919), English cricketer and footballer
William Allsop (1912–1997), English footballer

Other sports
Brian Allsop (1936–1989), Australian rugby league player
Fred Alsop (born 1938), British long jumper
Fred Allsopp (1869-1912), British jockey
Ian Alsop (born 1943), Scottish competitive track cyclist
Ted Allsopp (born 1926), Australian race walker
William Jonathan Alsop (1901–1964), Welsh boxer who fought under the name Young Allsopp

In other fields
Charles Allsopp, 6th Baron Hindlip (born 1940), British businessman
Christine Allsopp (born on 19 January 1947), Church of England priest, former Archdeacon of Northampton
Christopher Allsopp (born 1941), British economist, director of the Oxford Institute for Energy Studies
George Allsopp (disambiguation), various, including:
George Allsopp (fur trader) (1733–1805), British-born fur trader in Canada
Vincent Alsop (1630-1703), British Nonconformist clergyman

Fictional people
Madge Allsop, fictitious character invented by satirist Barry Humphries as the long-time companion of "Dame Edna Everage"

Other uses
Alsop en le Dale, a village in Derbyshire, England 
Alsop, Virginia, an unincorporated community
Alsop House may refer to:
Richard Alsop IV House (built 1838–1839), historic home in Middletown, Connecticut, designated a U.S. National Historic Landmark as "Alsop House"
Carroll Alsop House (built 1948), Oskaloosa, Iowa, a Frank Lloyd Wright-designed home
Alsop High School in Walton, Liverpool, England
Arthur Allsopp Shield, trophy symbolizing the Under 16 Boys championship of the Australian Softball Federation
Samuel Allsopp & Sons, one of the largest brewery companies operating in Burton upon Trent, England